Sebastian Johannes Aho (born 17 February 1996) is a Swedish professional ice hockey defenceman for the  New York Islanders of the National Hockey League (NHL). Aho was drafted by the Islanders, 139th overall, in the 2017 NHL Entry Draft. He is of Finnish descent through his father.

Playing career

SHL
Aho played as a youth with IF Björklöven before moving the fellow Swedish club, Skellefteå AIK. Aho made his Elitserien debut on the blueline in 1 game with Skellefteå AIK during the 2012–13 season. He was signed to a new four-year contract with the club on Tuesday, 28 May 2013.

After helping Skellefteå AIK claim a second straight championship, Aho was rated amongst the top 10 European skaters for the 2014 NHL Entry Draft. Despite this, Aho was passed over due to his diminutive size and returned to continue with Skellefteå AIK. After his first full SHL season in 2014–15, helping the club return to the finals for the third-consecutive season with 9 points in 41 games, Aho was again rated amongst the top 15 skaters for the 2015 NHL Entry Draft.

NHL
Aho was eventually drafted in his fourth eligible draft as an average prospect by the New York Islanders in the fifth round, 139th overall, of the 2017 NHL Entry Draft on 24 June 2017. He agreed to a three-year entry-level contract with the Islanders on 5 July 2017. Aho was assigned to the Islanders' American Hockey League (AHL) affiliate, the Bridgeport Sound Tigers to begin the 2017–18 season after attending training camp. He was recalled to the NHL on 28 December, and played his first NHL game in a 6–1 loss against the Colorado Avalanche on 31 December. He scored his first NHL goal in a 5–4 win over the New Jersey Devils on 7 January 2018.

After attending the Islanders training camp prior to the 2018–19 season, Aho was assigned to the Sound Tigers. On 3 January 2019, Aho and teammate Michael Dal Colle were selected to represent the Sound Tigers at the 2019 AHL All-Star Classic.

Career statistics

Regular season and playoffs

International

Awards and honors

References

External links
 

1996 births
Living people
Bridgeport Sound Tigers players
New York Islanders draft picks
New York Islanders players
Skellefteå AIK players
Sportspeople from Umeå
Swedish ice hockey defencemen
Swedish people of Finnish descent